Moin Nawaz Warraich (born 22 February 1949) is a Pakistani politician and retired military officer who was a member of the Provincial Assembly of the Punjab from May 2013 to May 2018.

Early life and education
Warraich was born on 22 February 1949 in Gujrat to Gul Nawaz Warraich. He graduated from Pakistan Military Academy  in 1970.

Military career
Warraich is a Pakistan Army officer and has served as a Major until his retirement in 1995.

Political career

Warraich ran for the seat of the Provincial Assembly of the Punjab as a candidate of Pakistan Peoples Party from Constituency PP-109 (Gujrat) in 2002 Pakistani general election but was unsuccessful.

Warraich was elected to the Provincial Assembly of the Punjab as a candidate of Pakistan Muslim League (Nawaz) from Constituency PP-109 (Gujrat-II) in 2013 Pakistani general election.

References 

Living people
Punjab MPAs 2013–2018
1949 births
Pakistan Army officers
Pakistan Military Academy alumni
Pakistan Muslim League (N) politicians